"San Bernadino" is a 1970 song by English band Christie. The song did not match the success of their previous single "Yellow River", but was still a top-ten hit in several countries and topped the charts in Switzerland. In the US, the song only managed to peak at number 100 on 30 January 1971. After the song became a hit, the band members admitted that they had never visited the city of San Bernardino, California.

Charts

References

1970 singles
Christie (band) songs
1970 songs
Number-one singles in Switzerland
Song recordings produced by Mike Smith (British record producer)